The following lists events that happened during 1899 in South Africa.

Incumbents
 Governor of the Cape of Good Hope and High Commissioner for Southern Africa:Alfred Milner.
 Governor of the Colony of Natal: Charles Bullen Hugh Mitchell.
 State President of the Orange Free State: Martinus Theunis Steyn.
 State President of the South African Republic: Paul Kruger.
 Prime Minister of the Cape of Good Hope: William Philip Schreiner.
 Prime Minister of the Colony of Natal: Henry Binns (until 17 August), Albert Henry Hime (starting 17 August).

Events

April
 The Transvaal government orders Asiatics to move into Locations specified by the government before 1 July.

May
 4 – Cape Town based food packaging company Imperial Cold Storage and Supply Company is founded in London.
 5 – Sir Alfred Milner, High Commissioner of South Africa and Governor of the Cape of Good Hope, sends a telegram to Joseph Chamberlain urging him to intervene in the South African Republic.

October
 1 – Jan Gysbert Hugo Bosman, aka Bosman de Ravelli, a concert pianist and composer, leaves South Africa for London.
 11 – The South African Republic declares war on Britain and launches the Second Boer War which will only end in 1902.
 13 – The Siege of Mafeking begins.
 14 – The Siege of Kimberley begins.
 20 – In the Battle of Talana Hill, the first major clash of the conflict near Dundee, Natal, the British Army drives the Boers from a hilltop position, but with heavy casualties, including their Commanding General Sir Penn Symons.
 30 – The Siege of Ladysmith begins.

Births
 30 January – Max Theiler, a virologist and the first South African to receive a Nobel Prize, is born in Pretoria.
 18 February – Aegidius Jean Blignaut, short story writer and creator of Hottentot Ruiter, is born in Kroonstad.

Deaths
 6 June – Sir Henry Binns, sugar cane farmer, founder of the Umhlanga Valley Sugar Estate Company and Natal politician, dies in Pietermaritzburg at the age of 61.

Railways

Railway lines opened

 31 January – Free State – Wolwehoek to Heilbron, .
 12 April – Cape Central – Roodewal to Swellendam, .
 1 May – Transvaal – Potgietersrus to Pietersburg, .
 25 October – Natal – Pietermaritzburg to New Hanover, .

Locomotives
 The Natal Government Railways places the first of 101 Class C  Reid Tenwheeler locomotives in service. In 1912 they will be designated Class H on the South African Railways (SAR).
 The New Cape Central Railway places its first Cape 7th Class  Mastodon type locomotive in service. In 1925 they will be designated Class 7E on the SAR.
 The Walvis Bay Railway places a single 2-4-2 tank locomotive named Hope in service.
 Rand Mines acquires two narrow gauge 0-4-0 tank steam locomotives from Avonside Engine Company.

References

 
South Africa
Years in South Africa